The Kazungula Ferry was a pontoon ferry across the  Zambezi River between Botswana and Zambia. The service was provided by two motorised pontoons and operated between border posts at Kazungula, Zambia and Kazungula, Botswana.

It linked the Livingstone-Sesheke road (which connects to the Trans–Caprivi Highway at Katima Mulilo and forms part of the Walvis Bay Corridor) to the main north–south highway of Botswana through Francistown and Gaborone to South Africa, and also to the Kasane-Victoria Falls road through Zimbabwe. It served the international road traffic of three countries directly (Zambia, Zimbabwe and Botswana) and of three more indirectly (Namibia, South Africa and DR Congo).

Whether Botswana and Zambia actually shared a common border, or whether the ferry was illegally crossing into Namibian or Rhodesian territory, was the subject of dispute. In 1970, South Africa (which at the time occupied Namibia) informed Botswana that there was no common border between Botswana and Zambia, claiming that a quadripoint existed. As a result, South Africa claimed, the Kazungula Ferry, which links Botswana and Zambia at the quadripoint, was illegal. Botswana firmly rejected both claims. There was actually a confrontation and shots were fired at the ferry; some years later, the Rhodesian Army attacked and sank the ferry, maintaining that it was serving military purposes.

In 2003 the ferry was the site of a disaster when a severely overloaded Zambian truck capsized one of the pontoons and 18 people drowned. The accident was blamed on the lack of weighbridges in Zambia to check the weight of trucks.

In August 2007, the governments of Zambia and Botswana announced a deal to construct the Kazungula Bridge at the site to replace the ferry. This matches the US Department of State Office of the Geographer depiction in Google Earth. The planned route for the new bridge crosses this boundary without entering Zimbabwe or Namibia.

Zimbabwe already has a bridge into Zambia at Victoria Falls,  from Kazungula. Namibia already has a bridge into Zambia at Katima Mulilo about  upriver. The bridge provides a direct connection between Zambia and Botswana. However, there is still no direct connection between Namibia and Zimbabwe, nor is one planned. Traffic from Namibia to Zimbabwe has to cross to Zambia at Katimo Mulilo, and then from Zambia into Zimbabwe at the Victoria Falls; or over Ngoma bridge into Botswana, and thence at the Kazungula Road crossing into Zimbabwe. In practice, though, there is very little such traffic along this route, or demand.  Most traffic between Namibia and Zimbabwe goes through Botswana via Maun, which is a considerably shorter route.

For those travelling from South Africa to Zambia's copperbelt or Lusaka by road, routes through Zimbabwe are several hundred kilometres shorter.

See also 
 Kazungula
 Kazungula Bridge

References

Ferries of Zambia
Botswana–Zambia border crossings
Zambezi River
Ferries of Botswana
Southern Province, Zambia